Desire Street is a street in New Orleans, Louisiana, in the United States. According to John Churchill Chase, the street is named for Désirée Gautier Montrieul, the daughter of Robert Gautier de Montrieul who owned the plantation on the land where the street now lies.  She married François de La Barre, for whom Labarre Road in Metairie is named. Her sister, Elmire de Montrieul, also had a street named after which was itself anglicized as Elmire Street, however it was renamed to Gallier Street circa 1895.   Jed Horne, author of the 2005 book Desire Street, suggests that name is a misspelled homage to Désirée Clary a fiancé of Napoleon. The play A Streetcar Named Desire, by Tennessee Williams, refers to the former streetcar line to this street.

Desire Street is part of the title of a 1949 book titled Frenchmen Desire Good Children on New Orleans street names by John Churchill Chase. The Desire neighborhood in the Upper Ninth Ward is named after the street, as are the area's Desire Projects although the housing development has been razed and replaced with smaller apartment buildings. Since Hurricane Katrina, most of the apartments are abandoned and in disrepair.

See also
 Desire Area, New Orleans
 List of streets of New Orleans
 Streetcars in New Orleans

References

Streets in New Orleans